Jouan Patrice Abanda Etong (born 3 August 1978) is a Cameroonian former professional footballer who played as a central defender.

He played for Apollon Kalamarias in Greece and Sparta Prague in the Czech Republic.

He played for Cameroon and participated at the 1998 FIFA World Cup, and the 2000 Summer Olympics where Cameroon won the gold medal.

External links
 
 
 
 Profile at weltfussball.de

1978 births
Living people
Footballers from Yaoundé
Association football central defenders
Czech First League players
AC Sparta Prague players
PAOK FC players
Apollon Pontou FC players
FK Drnovice players
FK Teplice players
Besa Kavajë players
1998 FIFA World Cup players
Cameroon international footballers
Cameroonian expatriate footballers
Cameroonian expatriate sportspeople in Greece
Cameroonian expatriate sportspeople in the Czech Republic
Cameroonian footballers
Expatriate footballers in Albania
Expatriate footballers in Greece
Expatriate footballers in the Czech Republic
Footballers at the 2000 Summer Olympics
Olympic footballers of Cameroon
Olympic gold medalists for Cameroon
Cameroonian expatriate sportspeople in Albania
Olympic medalists in football
Medalists at the 2000 Summer Olympics
Kategoria Superiore players